Palmer High School is a public high school located in the city of Palmer, Massachusetts, United States.

Demographics and statistics

For the 20152016 school year, Palmer High School enrolled 489 students in grades 8 through 12.  Out of these students, 88.8% were Caucasian, 2.0% were African American, 5.1% were Hispanic, 0.0% were Native American, 0.2% were Native Hawaiian/Pacific Islander and 1.4% were Multi-Ethnic.  About 52.1% of the student population is male, while 47.9% is female.

Notable alumni
Todd Smola, member of Massachusetts House of Representatives (class of 1995)

References

Schools in Hampden County, Massachusetts
Public high schools in Massachusetts